Walter Alexander may refer to:
 Walter Alexander Coachbuilders, Scottish bus coachbuilder
 W. Alexander & Sons, Scottish former bus operator 
 Walter G. Alexander I (1880–1953), African American physician and politician from New Jersey
 Walter Alexander, participant in the O. J. Simpson robbery case